Hegesinus of Pergamon, was an Academic Skeptic philosopher from Pergamon. He was the successor of Evander and the immediate predecessor of Carneades as the leader (scholarch) of the Platonic Academy, and served for a period around 160 BC. Nothing else is known about him.

Notes

References
K. Algra, J. Barnes, J. Mansfeld, M. Schofield, The Cambridge History of Hellenistic Philosophy. Pages 32–33. Cambridge University Press. (2005).

Academic philosophers
Hellenistic-era philosophers from Anatolia
People from Pergamon
2nd-century BC Greek people
2nd-century BC philosophers
Ancient Skeptic philosophers